Sam Hardy may refer to:
 Sam Hardy (actor)
 Sam Hardy (footballer)
 Sam Hardy (rower)

See also
 Samuel Hardy, American lawyer, planter and politician